AS Kuya Sport is a Congolese football club based in Kinshasa and currently playing in the Linafoot, the first level of the Congolese football.

Coaches 
 2020 :  Diego Romano, ass.  Lassa Nuni

References

Football clubs in the Democratic Republic of the Congo
Football clubs in Lubumbashi